Salem Bitar  is a Syrian football goalkeeper who played for the Syria in the 1996 Asian Cup.

External links

11v11.com

Syrian footballers
Living people
1973 births
Sportspeople from Homs
Association football goalkeepers
Syrian Premier League players
Syria international footballers